Haider Mahmoud (Arabic :حيدر محمود) is a poet and a Jordanian nationalist of Palestinian origin. He was born in Haifa in 1942. His family fled their home in the aftermath of the 1948 Arab-Israeli war. He studied in Amman before pursuing his higher education in the United Kingdom and the United States.

Mahmoud worked in journalism and the media, he was also Jordan's ambassador to Tunisia, and he later held the culture portfolio in the Jordanian government. He was appointed as a member of the 26th Senate of Jordan on 24 October 2013. He was reappointed to the 27th Senate on 27 September 2016.

A poem he wrote in early April 1989 about the social injustices facing ordinary citizens was one of the triggers of the civil unrest that took several Jordanian cities later that month. Mahmoud held the position of advisor to the prime minister at the time; he was sacked and ordered to be imprisoned by martial law decree, but was released on the same day by direct order from King Hussein.

Mahmoud's works were published in several languages, including Spanish, Japanese, Korean, French and Serbian, and his works are taught in the Jordanian curriculum in both the school and university levels.  He was granted an honorary doctorate from the World Academy for Culture and Arts in the Republic of China in 1986. 

Mahmoud was granted several Arab and International awards and medals, including the King Abdullah II Award for Innovation in the Field of Literature (Jordan, 2004), The Independence Medal of First Order (Jordan, 1991), Medal of the Republic of the Supreme Order (Tunisia, 1999), Ibn Khafaja Award for Poetry (Spain, 1986).

He currently writes a weekly column in the Jordanian newspaper Ad-Dustour.

Published anthologies 
 Yamurru Hatha Al Layl (The Night Shall Pass) 1969.
 I'tithar An Khalal Fanni Tare'e (Apology for a Technical Fault) 1979.
 Shajar Addufla Ala Al Nahr Yughanni (The Oleander Sings by the River) 1981.
 Min Akwal Al Shahed Al Akheer (From the Words of The Last Witness) 1986.
 The Complete Works, (Vol I) 1990.
 Al Nar Allati La Tushbih Al Nar (The Fire Which is not Like Fire) 1999.
 The Complete Works (Vol II) 2000
 Aba'at Al Farah Al Akhdar (The Shawls of Green Joy) 2006.
 Fil Bid'e Kan Al Nahr (In The Beginning There was the River) 2007.

Plays 
 Arageel Wa Suyuf 1969.
 Birjas 1977.

References

External links 

 حيدر محمود
 Arabian Business Magazine Power 500 list of 2010
 Al Jazeera Interview, August 2009
 Jordan Ministry of Culture Link in Arabic.
 Al Jazeera Interview, 2004 Link in Arabic.

1942 births
Living people
21st-century Jordanian poets
20th-century Palestinian poets
Jordanian people of Palestinian descent
People from Haifa
Government ministers of Jordan
Culture ministers of Jordan
Ambassadors of Jordan to Tunisia
Jordanian nationalists
21st-century Palestinian poets
Palestinian male poets
20th-century male writers
21st-century male writers
20th-century Jordanian poets